Detonautas Roque Clube is the debut album released in 2002 by the alternative rock band with the same name.

Track listing

 "No Way Out"
 "Outro Lugar" 
 "Quando O Sol Se For"
 "Ei, Peraê!" 
 "Olhos Certos"
 "Nem Me Lembro Mais"
 "Bem E O Mal" ''
 "Ladrão De Gravata"
 "Mais Além"
 "Que Diferença Faz?"

Credits 
 Tico Santa Cruz - Vocals
 Renato Rocha - Lead guitars, backing vocals
 Rodrigo Netto - Rhythm guitars
 Cléston - DJ
 Fábio Brasil - Drums

References

2002 debut albums
Detonautas Roque Clube albums